The number of states headed by Elizabeth II varied during her 70 years as queen, altogether seeing her as sovereign of a total of 32 independent countries during this period. In her capacity as Queen of the United Kingdom (including the British overseas territories), she was also monarch of three Crown Dependencies—the Channel Island of Guernsey and Jersey (as the Duke of Normandy), and the Isle of Man (as the Lord of Mann)—and, in her capacity as Queen of New Zealand, she was monarch of two associated states—the Cook Islands and Niue—after they acquired this status in 1965 and 1974, respectively.

The situations in two countries differ from the others. The government of the unrecognised state of Rhodesia proclaimed its allegiance to Elizabeth II as Queen of Rhodesia from 1965 to 1970. However, she did not accept either the role or the title and it was not accepted or recognised by any other state. Fiji became a republic through a military coup in 1987, after which its Great Council of Chiefs continued to recognise Elizabeth II as queen, or Paramount Chief of Fiji, until the council's disestablishment on 14 March 2012. This was only a ceremonial title, with no role in government.

See also
 Commonwealth realm
 Country
 List of prime ministers of Elizabeth II
 Personal union
 Timeline of country and capital changes

Notes

Elizabeth II
Elizabeth II, states
Elizabeth II
Elizabeth II-related lists